Heterocrossa contactella is a species of moth in the family Carposinidae. It is endemic to New Zealand and can be observed in both the North and South Islands. The preferred habitat of this species is native forest and scrub, especially where Leptospermum shrubs are found. Adults are on the wing in December and January.

Taxonomy 
This species was described by Francis Walker in 1866 using material collected in Nelson by T. R. Oxley in 1860 and named Tinea contactella. In 1905 Edward Meyrick placed this species within the genus Heterocrossa.  In 1911, thinking he was describing a new species, Edward Meyrick named the moth Carposina amalodes. In 1922 Meyrick listed Heterocrossa as a synonym for Carposina. George Hudson, in his 1928 publication The Butterflies and Moths of New Zealand, discusses this species under both the names Carposina contactella and Carposina amalodes. In 1978 Elwood Zimmerman argued that the genus Heterocrassa  should not be a synonym of Carposina as the genitalia of the species within the genus Heterocrassa are distinctive. In 1988 John S. Dugdale synonymised the name Carposina amalodes and assigned the species to the genus Heterocrossa. This placement was followed by the New Zealand Inventory of Biodiversity. The lectotype specimen is held at the Natural History Museum, London.

Description 

Meyrick described the species as follows:

Distribution 

This species is endemic to New Zealand. This species can be found in both the North and South Islands and has been observed in the Auckland region, Whanganui River, Paekakariki, Wellington, Otira River, Ida Valley, Queenstown, Invercargill and Bluff. Hudson regarded it as uncommon.

Biology and behaviour 
Adults of this species is on the wing in October, December and January.

Habitat 
H. contactella prefers light forest and scrub habitat, especially where Leptospermum shrubs are found.

References

Carposinidae
Moths of New Zealand
Taxa named by Francis Walker (entomologist)
Endemic fauna of New Zealand
Moths described in 1866
Endemic moths of New Zealand